Richard Wenman may refer to:

Richard Wenman (MP for Northampton) (1524-73), MP for Northampton (UK Parliament constituency)
Richard Wenman, 1st Viscount Wenman (1573–1640), English landowner, MP for Oxfordshire
Richard Wenman, 4th Viscount Wenman (1657–1690), English landowner, MP for Brackley and Oxfordshire
Richard Wenman, 5th Viscount Wenman (1688–1729), English landowner, Viscount Wenman
Richard Wenman (Nova Scotia politician) (c. 1712–1781), Nova Scotia merchant and politician